Din Gabay (born September 19, 1992) is a retired Israeli footballer. He is the son of Ronen Gabay.

Club career statistics
(correct as of August 2012)

References

External links
 

1992 births
Living people
Israeli footballers
Beitar Nes Tubruk F.C. players
Maccabi Netanya F.C. players
Beitar Tel Aviv Bat Yam F.C. players
Hakoah Maccabi Amidar Ramat Gan F.C. players
Israeli Premier League players
Liga Leumit players
Footballers from Netanya
Association football defenders